The list of ship commissionings in 1969 includes a chronological list of all ships commissioned in 1969.


See also 

1969
 Ship commissionings